The First Mrs. Fraser is a 1932 British musical romance film directed by Thorold Dickinson and Sinclair Hill and starring Henry Ainley, Joan Barry and Dorothy Dix. It is an adaptation of the 1929 play The First Mrs. Fraser by St. John Greer Ervine. It was made at Wembley Studios. The sets were designed by J. Elder Wills and Oscar Werndorff.

Cast 
 Henry Ainley as James Fraser
 Joan Barry as Elsie Fraser
 Dorothy Dix as Janet Fraser
 Harold Huth as Mario
 Richard Cooper as Lord Larne
 Henry Hewitt as Philip Logan
 Gibb McLaughlin as Butler
 Hargrave Pawson as Ninian Fraser
 Millicent Wolf as Mabel
 Ellen Pollock as Maid
 Ivan Brandt as Murdo Fraser
 Oriel Ross as Connie
 Eileen Peel as Ellen Fraser
 Naunton Wayne as Compere
 Frances Day as Night-club Singer
 Billy Cotton as Band Leader

References

Bibliography 
Low, Rachael. Filmmaking in 1930s Britain. George Allen & Unwin, 1985.
Wood, Linda. British Films, 1927–1939. British Film Institute, 1986.

External links 

1932 films
1930s romantic musical films
British romantic musical films
British films based on plays
Films set in England
Films shot at Wembley Studios
Films directed by Thorold Dickinson
Films directed by Sinclair Hill
British black-and-white films
1930s English-language films
1930s British films